Shephard is an unincorporated community in south central Crow Wing County, Minnesota, United States. It is located approximately ten miles south-southeast of Brainerd along State Highway 25 (MN 25) at the junction with Crow Wing County Road 2. Daggett Brook flows past the west side of the community and South Long Lake lies approximately three miles to the north.

References

Unincorporated communities in Crow Wing County, Minnesota
Unincorporated communities in Minnesota